Jeffrey Dean McLaughlin (born October 31, 1965 in Summit, New Jersey) is an American rower. He is a 1989 graduate of Northeastern University and is a member of the school's Hall of Fame. He earned a bronze medal in the Men's 8+ at the 1988 Olympics in Seoul, a silver medal in the Men's 4- at the 1992 Olympics in Barcelona, as well as gold (1987) and silver (1991) medals at the World Rowing Championships.

McLaughlin lives in Wexford, Pennsylvania with his wife and two daughters.

References 

 
 
 Article at gonu.com

1965 births
Living people
Rowers at the 1988 Summer Olympics
Rowers at the 1992 Summer Olympics
Olympic silver medalists for the United States in rowing
Olympic bronze medalists for the United States in rowing
American male rowers
World Rowing Championships medalists for the United States
Medalists at the 1992 Summer Olympics
Medalists at the 1988 Summer Olympics